Catholicos of the East is the title that has been held by the ecclesiastical heads of the Church of the East, the Grand Metropolitan of Seleucia-Ctesiphon, since AD. 280.

The term "Catholicos" is derived from the Greek word Katholikos (Καθολικός), meaning "Universal Bishop". The title Catholicos, is used in several Eastern Christian churches and implies a degree of sovereignty and autocephaly.

Catholicos of the East refers to:
 Catholicos-Patriarch of the East, primate (Catholicos-Patriarch) of the Church of the East.
It may also refer to the ecclesiastical heads of the different branches of the Church of the East
Catholicos-Patriarch of the Assyrian Church of the East
Catholicos-Patriarchs of the Ancient Church of the East
Chaldean Catholic Patriarchs of Babylon

Catholicos of the East also refers to some ecclesiastical institutions of later origin:
 Syriac Maphrian of the East 
 Catholicos of the East and Malankara Metropolitan, the primate of Malankara Orthodox Syrian Church.  The Catholicos position came into existence in the Church in 1912 with the establishment of the Catholicate. From 1934, the Catholicos began to hold the position of Malankara Metropolitan also, another important title in the Church.
 Catholicos of India, the head of the Jacobite Syrian Christian Church, whose historic titles are Catholicos of the East and Metropolitan of Malankara.

References

Sources

 

 
 
 

Eastern Christianity 
Eastern Orthodoxy 
Oriental Orthodoxy 
Eastern Catholicism
Church_of_the_East